The Devil's Grinding Mill, sometimes known as the Devil's Hole, is part of The Angel's Drainpipe, a partially collapsed cave system on the River Eden in England, which forms dramatic gorges and natural arches. It is south of Kirkby Stephen, within Stenkrith Park. The water moving with the caves and gorges produces an incessant roar. Geologically it is unusual as it has formed not in true limestone, but in brockram, a breccia of limestone fragments within sandstone.

In 1828 it was visited by a travel writer who remembered it as follows (some of the details and spellings have changed or been misremembered by the author):

References

Geology of Cumbria
Natural arches of England
Caves of Cumbria
Kirkby Stephen